Redi Maloku Stadium is a multi-use stadium in Fushë Krujë, Albania. The stadium has a capacity of 3,000 people and it is mostly used for football matches and it is the home ground of KS Iliria.

References

Football venues in Albania
Multi-purpose stadiums
Buildings and structures in Krujë